The 1997–98 Delaware Fightin' Blue Hens men's basketball team represented the University of Delaware during the 1997–98 NCAA Division I men's basketball season. The Fightin' Blue Hens, led by third-year head coach Mike Brey, played their home games at the Delaware Field House and were members of the America East Conference. They finished the season 20–10, 12–6 in AEC play to finish atop the conference regular season standings. They were champions of the AEC tournament to earn an automatic bid to the NCAA tournament where they lost in the opening round to No. 2 seed Purdue.

Roster

Schedule and results

|-
!colspan=9 style=| Regular season

|-
!colspan=9 style=| America East tournament

|-
!colspan=9 style=| NCAA tournament

References

Delaware Fightin' Blue Hens men's basketball seasons
Delaware
Delaware
Fight
Fight